Britain's Next Big Thing (previously known as The Buying Game) is a 2011 BBC television series hosted by Theo Paphitis that goes behind closed doors at some of the biggest names in UK retail to expose the secret world of buying for the first time. The programme follows the progress of prospective entrepreneurs and the buying teams that have the power to create trends, make or break careers and decide exactly what the public buys.

BBC Television shows
BBC Daytime television series